Justine Wright is a film editor from Wellington, New Zealand.

In 2000, the film One Day in September, which Wright had edited, won an Academy Award for Best Documentary. She also won the Best Newcomer Behind the Camera award at the British Independent Film Awards for the same film.

In 2014, Wright won the European Editor of the Year Award at the European Film Awards. In 2016, she was co-winner (with Noam Amit) at the Jerusalem Film Festival of the Haggiag Award for Best Editing for her work in Forever Pure.

Filmography 

 One Day in September (1999) - won Best Documentary at the 72nd Academy Awards
Late Night Shopping (2001) - won a BAFTA (Scotland) Best Feature Film award
 The Game of Their Lives (2002) - won Best Sports Documentary at the British Television Awards
 The Final Curtain (2002)
 Touching the Void (2003)
 The Last King of Scotland (2006)
 State of Play (2009)
 The Eagle (2011)
 The Iron Lady (2011)
 Locke (2013)
 Black Sea (2014)
 The Pass (2016)
 Forever Pure (2016)
 Denial (2016)
 Yardie (2018)
 The Mauritanian (2021)

References

Further reading
 An appreciation of Wright and her collaboration with Kevin MacDonald written by filmmaker Peter H. Morris.

Documentary film editors
New Zealand film editors
Living people
Year of birth missing (living people)
People from Wellington City